This article contains the family trees of members of the Liu clan, who ruled the state of Shu Han (221-263) in the Three Kingdoms period (220-280) in China. They were related to the House of Liu, the imperial clan of the Han dynasty.

Liu Bei's ancestors
Liu Bei's biography in the Sanguozhi stated that Liu Bei was a descendant of Liu Sheng (Prince of Zhongshan), who was a son of Emperor Jing. Liu Sheng's son was Liu Zhen.

However, the Dianlue claimed that Liu Bei descended from the Marquis of Linyi. Based on historical records in the Han Shu and the Houhanshu, there were two Marquis of Linyi lineages which could be traced to Emperor Jing's sons, hence there were another two lines from which Liu Bei could have possibly descended.

The central line in the family tree below shows the Liu Sheng lineage, while the other two show the Marquis of Linyi lineages.

Liu Bei

Liu Bei's father was Liu Hong. Liu Hong's father was Liu Xiong. Liu Bei's uncle was Liu Zijing.

Liu Bei had four wives: Lady Gan, Lady Mi, Lady Sun and Empress Mu. Lady Mi was the younger sister of Mi Zhu and Mi Fang; Lady Sun was Sun Quan's younger sister (see Eastern Wu family trees for details); Empress Mu, née Wu, was Wu Yi's younger sister.

Lady Gan bore Liu Shan. Liu Yong and Liu Li were also Liu Bei's sons and were Liu Shan's younger half-brothers. Liu Yong and Liu Li were born to different mothers. Liu Bei had two daughters, who were captured by Cao Chun during the Battle of Changban. Liu Feng was Liu Bei's adopted son.

Liu Li had two sons: Liu Yin and Liu Ji. Liu Yin's son was Liu Cheng. Liu Yong's grandson was Liu Xuan.

Liu Shan

Liu Shan had four wives: Empress Jing'ai, Empress Zhang, Lady Li and Lady Wang. Empress Jing'ai, née Zhang, was Empress Zhang's elder sister. Both of them were Zhang Fei's daughters.

Lady Wang bore Liu Xuan. Liu Shan had another six sons: Liu Yao, Liu Cong, Liu Zan, Liu Chen, Liu Xun and Liu Qian. The identities of their mothers were not known.

See also
 Cao Wei family trees
 Eastern Wu family trees
 Family tree of Sima Yi

References

 Ban, Biao; Ban, Gu; Ban, Zhao. Book of Han (Han Shu).
 Chen, Shou. Records of the Three Kingdoms (Sanguozhi).
 Fan, Ye. Book of the Later Han (Houhanshu).
 Pei, Songzhi. Annotations to Records of the Three Kingdoms (Sanguozhi zhu).

Shu Han
Dynasty genealogy